Yang Xiaoli (born 1 September 1990) is a Chinese amateur boxer, and a three-time women's world boxing champion. She won the gold medal in the light heavyweight division at the 2014 and 2016 Women's World Boxing Championships. She won the gold medal in the heavyweight division at the 2018 Women's World Boxing Championships.

References

Living people
1990 births
Chinese women boxers
Light-heavyweight boxers
Heavyweight boxers
AIBA Women's World Boxing Championships medalists
People from Haiyang